Conversion to Islam in U.S. prisons refers to the contemporary high rate of conversion to Islam in American prisons, for which there are a number of factors. It is the fastest growing religion in U.S. prisons, where the population is 18 percent Muslim (compared to 1 percent for the general population); 80 percent of all prison religious conversions are to Islam.

Early history
Black Muslim organizations, such as The Nation of Islam and Moorish Science Temple of America, formally began prison outreach efforts in 1942.  However evidence suggests that Muslims may have comprised a small fraction of the inmate population in the United States as early as the 1910s. New research brought to light an African immigrant inmate at San Quentin State Prison named Lucius Lehman, who was proclaiming himself to be a Muslim religious leader while calling for Black nationalism during his incarceration from 1910–1924.  Although there is no documentation that Lehman himself converted to Islam or converted others in prison, it appears that he achieved some level of influence among the prison's Black population during his incarceration. Nation of Islam leader Elijah Muhammad himself was incarcerated in the early 1940s when he was convicted of draft evasion. Elijah Muhammad's organization would later gain its most famous convert, Malcolm X, who took interest in the Black Muslim movement while also incarcerated in the 1950s.  A small but steady stream of conversions occurred in the 1950s and early 1960s. In New York, evidence of Sunni Muslims worshiping openly in the state's correctional facilities appeared in the 1960s.   These inmates reached out to a local New York Muslim community called Darul Islam for assistance, which eventually led to an active Muslim-based prison ministry and educational program forming in the state.  Muslim prison outreach efforts during this era sought to instill values of honesty, hard work, individual responsibility, and mechanisms for dealing with rehabilitation as well as coping with drug and alcohol abuse.

Prisoner rights
The Hands-off Doctrine, the approach where federal courts refrained from interfering on inmate rights cases for many decades, was a practice that dated back to the early 20th century and was still practiced by 1960. Despite the growth of conversions to Islam within prisons, states such as California, New York and Texas still had not yet recognized or accommodated the religious activity of Muslim inmates by the start of the 1960s. As the number of incarcerated Muslims began to reach a critical mass, prisoners petitioned courts to advance their religious rights.  The Hands-off Doctrine began to diminish during the 1960s as courts started to look into specific violations regarding prisoners.   Cases involving Muslim prisoners began succeeding in gaining recognition for a variety of rights over the next several years, such as freedom from punishment due to religion, the right to hold religious services, the right to possess and wear religious medals, and the right to proselytize. New York's State Department of Correctional Services offered to hire Muslim chaplains as department employees by 1975,  with the Texas Department of Corrections hiring its first Muslim chaplain two years later. Muslims later won the legal right to obtain religious (halal) diets in prison, with federal prisons attempting to accommodate halal diets beginning in 1983. Some argue that Islam's growth in prisons was made possible through these court cases. These legal victories not only solidified Islam as a legitimate religion among corrections staff and prisoners, but also placed Muslim groups at the center of the prisoners' rights movement for obtaining constitutional rights on behalf of the incarcerated.

Modern history

The immigrant Muslim population of the United States increased dramatically after the 1960s due the passage of the Immigration and Nationality Act of 1965, which abolished previous immigration quotas.  This closely coincided with the transformation of the Nation of Islam into mainstream Sunni Islam ideology under the leadership of Elijah Muhammad's successor and son Warith Deen Mohammed.  Immigrant Muslims began getting involved in the work of Muslim prison ministry and rehabilitation, established by their African American Muslims brethren decades before, during the second half of the 20th century in nearly every major American city. Many mosques across the country have some sort of active prison ministry for currently or formerly incarcerated Muslims, with a strong presence from predominantly African American mosques. Some activities include regular prison visits, prison chaplaincy services, counseling to ex-offenders, participation in transitional or halfway homes and substance abuse programs. The vast majority of Muslims in prisons have identified with Sunni Islam or global Islam through the work of these newer prison ministries by the year 2000. Presently, several Muslim-based organizations such as Link Outside and Tayba Foundation have emerged that specifically focus on providing both in-prison and reentry services.  Some studies have indicated the rate of recidivism among Muslims is actually lower than any other group.

Rate of conversion to Islam
Professor Lawrence Mamiya  of Religion and Africana Studies argues that Islam's appeal in prison is partially due to the spiritual and theological dimensions of the religion (such as brotherhood along with racial and social justice) as well as the social aspect (such as protection and communal life) it provides the inmate. J. Michael Waller, senior analyst for Strategy at the far-right Center for Security Policy, claims that 80% of the prisoners who find faith while in prison convert to Islam. He also claims that Muslim inmates comprise 17–20% of the prison population in New York, or roughly 350,000 inmates in 2003.  Independent studies show similar rates within prisons in the upper Midwest (in urban areas such as Chicago, Detroit, and Cleveland) and on the West Coast (in the San Francisco Bay Area and Los Angeles).  These converted inmates are mostly African American, with a growing Hispanic minority. According to a 2003 estimate by FBI, there are 350,000 Muslims in federal, state and local prison, about 30,000 – 40,000 more being converted every year.

Muslims prisoners have been characterized as a danger or threat for radicalization in the media. Yet despite the fact of there being over 350,000 Muslim inmates in the United States, little evidence indicates widespread radicalization or foreign recruitment.  Rather, research has shown that Islam has a long history of positive influence on prisoners, including supporting inmate rehabilitation for decades. An early example of this type of characterizations from the media is an article in The New York Times that alleged Imam Warith Deen Umar, Islamic chaplain for the New York State prison system, was reported to have praised the September 11 attacks; prompting members of Congress to call for an investigation.  The article states that in a 2004 report, the Justice Department faulted the prison system for failing to protect against "infiltration by religious extremists." However, the report made clear that the problem was not chaplains, but rather unsupervised inmates. In January 2010, the Senate Foreign Relations Committee, chaired by Senator John Kerry, released a report that stated as many as three dozen formerly incarcerated individuals who converted to Islam in American prisons have moved to Yemen where they could pose a "significant threat". However no documentation or verifiable evidence was provided to back up the committee's report (even though the report stated the individuals traveled to apparently learn Arabic)—rather it was simply accepted and invoked as evidence.  Another example of such characterization comes from Annenberg Professor of International Communication J. Michael Waller, who asserted that outside Islamist groups linked to terrorism are attempting to radicalize Muslim converts in prison, but other experts suggest that when radicalization does occur, it has little to no connection with these outside interests.

Notable converts to Islam in prison

Prisoners
Flesh N Bone – A member of the award-winning rap group Bone Thugs N Harmony
Charles Brooks, Jr. – convicted murderer; converted to Islam before execution
H. Rap Brown – former Black Panther; currently in prison for murdering a police officer
Tray Deee – American rapper
Jeff Fort – former Chicago  gang leader; convicted in 1987 of conspiring with Libya to perform acts of domestic terrorism
Kevin Gates – an African-American rapper
Bernard Hopkins – former middleweight and light heavyweight boxing champion
Malcolm X – A Civil Rights activist
Demetrius "Hook" Mitchell – basketball player
Abdul Alim Musa –  Muslim-American activist
Montel Vontavious Porter – professional wrestler signed to the WWE
Mike Tyson – former heavyweight boxing champion

Others
Terry Holdbrooks – Former GTMO guard, later became an author and public speaker.

See also

 Conversion to Islam in prisons
 Islam in the African diaspora
 Islamic Missionary Activity
 Jihadist extremism in the United States#Prison
 Religion in United States prisons

Further reading

Felber, Garrett. 2018. "“Shades of Mississippi”: The Nation of Islam's Prison Organizing, the Carceral State, and the Black Freedom Struggle." Journal of American History 105(1): 71–95.
Felber, Garrett. 2020. Those Who Know Don't Say: The Nation of Islam, the Black Freedom Movement, and the Carceral State. University of North Carolina Press.

References

External links
 Why American prisoners convert to Islam, This is Life with Lisa Ling on CNN
 
 
 Link Outside Muslim-based prison outreach organization
 Tayba Foundation Muslim-based prison outreach organization

Conversion to Islam
Penal system in the United States
Islam in the United States